The European Public Health Alliance (EPHA) is a European non-profit association registered in Belgium. Its members are non-profit organisations active in public health. The EPHA has 89 member organisations based in 21 European countries. Sascha Marschang is currently Acting Secretary General of EPHA. Its headquarters are in Brussels, Belgium.

Structure 
EPHA is an international non-profit organisation (“AISBL” in French) under Belgian law. Its statutes are approved by its General Assembly, composed of representatives of its members.

A Board of Trustees sets out the organisation's annual work programme, priorities and targets, and reviews the financial management of the EPHA. The EPHA Board is composed of 7 representatives elected by members of the EPHA for a 2-year mandate. Freek Spinnewijn is currently the president of the EPHA Board.

History
The European Public Health Alliance (EPHA) organisation was established in 1993 after the ratification of the Maastricht Treaty of 1992 which for the first time gave the European Community responsibilities in health protection. The European Community Amsterdam Treaty Article 152 extended EU competence to promoting health of European citizens, in addition to protecting it as in Article 129 of the Maastricht Treaty.

See also

 Health care
 Directorate-General for Health and Consumer Protection

References
 European Public Health Alliance
 European Community Treaties: articles 152 and 95 EC

External links
 

Public health organizations
Organizations established in 1993
Medical and health organisations based in Belgium
European medical and health organizations
Health and the European Union